Cuauhtémoc Anda Gutiérrez (born 25 December 1938) is a Mexican politician affiliated with the Institutional Revolutionary Party. He served as Deputy of the LI and LIV Legislatures representing the Federal District.

He was the President of the Chamber of Deputies in 1980.

References

1938 births
Living people
Members of the Chamber of Deputies (Mexico)
Presidents of the Chamber of Deputies (Mexico)
Institutional Revolutionary Party politicians
20th-century Mexican politicians
Politicians from Mexico City
Deputies of the LIV Legislature of Mexico